The 2008 Big East Conference baseball tournament was held at Bright House Field in Clearwater, FL. This was the twenty fourth annual Big East Conference baseball tournament, and second to be held at Bright House Field. The  won their first tournament championship and claimed the Big East Conference's automatic bid to the 2008 NCAA Division I baseball tournament. Louisville joined the league prior to the 2006 season.

Format and seeding 
The Big East baseball tournament was an 8 team double elimination tournament in 2008. The top eight regular season finishers were seeded one through eight based on conference winning percentage only. The field was divided into two brackets, with the winners of each bracket meeting in a single championship game.

Tournament 

† - Indicates game was suspended after seven innings due to 10 run mercy rule. ‡ - Indicates game was suspended after 8 innings due to 10 run mercy rule.

All-Tournament Team 
The following players were named to the All-Tournament team.

Jack Kaiser Award 
Chris Dominguez was the winner of the 2008 Jack Kaiser Award. Dominguez was a sophomore third baseman for Louisville.

References 

Tournament
Big East Conference Baseball Tournament
Big East Conference baseball tournament
Big East Conference baseball tournament
College baseball tournaments in Florida
Baseball competitions in Clearwater, Florida